Diego Merino, O. Carm.  (1570 – 1 January 1637) was a Catholic prelate who served as Bishop of Isernia (1626–1637)
and Bishop of Montepeloso (1623–1626).

Biography
Diego Merino was born in Baeza, Spain in 1570 and ordained a priest in the Order of the Brothers of the Blessed Virgin Mary of Mount Carmel.
On 20 November 1623, he was appointed during the papacy of Pope Paul V as Bishop of Montepeloso.
On 26 November 1623, he was consecrated bishop by Giovanni Garzia Mellini, Cardinal-Priest of Santi Quattro Coronati with Alessandro Bosco, Bishop of Gerace, and Tommaso Ximenes, Bishop of Fiesole, serving as co-consecrators. 
On 24 August 1626, he was appointed during the papacy of Pope Urban VIII as Bishop of Isernia.
He served as Bishop of Isernia until his death on 1 January 1637. 
While bishop, he was the principal co-consecrator of Giulio Cesare Sacchetti, Bishop of Gravina di Puglia (1623).

References

External links and additional sources
 (Chronology of Bishops) 
 (Chronology of Bishops) 
 (for Chronology of Bishops) 
 (for Chronology of Bishops)  

17th-century Italian Roman Catholic bishops
Bishops appointed by Pope Paul V
Bishops appointed by Pope Urban VIII
1570 births
1637 deaths
Carmelite bishops